Berjaya Dragons was a Malaysian esports organisation which had teams competing in League of Legends and League of Legends: Wild Rift. Its League of Legends team competed in the Pacific Championship Series (PCS), the top-level league for the game in Taiwan, Hong Kong, Macau, and Southeast Asia.

Berjaya Dragons was acquired by rival esports organisation SEM9 on 16 November 2021. Their League of Legends and League of Legends: Wild Rift rosters were subsequently merged.

League of Legends

History 

Berjaya Dragons was announced as the tenth and final team to join the PCS on 17 January 2020. On 1 February the team revealed their ten-man roster, although only six players—Azhi, Enso, Maoan, Minji, K2, and Kagame—participated in their inaugural split.

Berjaya Dragons finished fourth in the 2020 PCS Spring regular season, qualifying for the first round of playoffs in the winners' bracket. The team defeated Alpha Esports in the first round but lost to Machi Esports in the second, bumping them down to the losers' bracket, where they were eliminated from playoffs by Hong Kong Attitude.

Final roster

Tournament results

League of Legends: Wild Rift

History 

Berjaya Dragons was one of the first Malaysian esports organisations to enter the professional Wild Rift scene. The team placed second in their first official Wild Rift tournament, the 2021 Malaysian Icon Series Preseason, losing 2–3 to Geek Fam in a best-of-five finals.

Berjaya Dragons qualified for the 2021 Malaysian Icon Series Summer Season and placed second in the regular season, earning them a spot in the playoffs. The team defeated Sem 9 in the winners' bracket but lost to Geek Fam in the next series, falling to the losers' bracket. There, Berjaya Dragons defeated Sem 9 once again and earned a spot in the finals, as well as the 2021 Summer Super Cup. In the finals, Berjaya Dragons faced off against Geek Fam yet again, but this time they managed to defeat Geek Fam and win the tournament.

Final roster

References

External links 
 

2020 establishments in Malaysia
Esports teams established in 2020
Esports teams based in Malaysia
Former Pacific Championship Series teams